Iridomyrmex omalonotus is a species of ant in the genus Iridomyrmex. Described by Heterick and Shattuck in 2011, the ant is endemic to Australia, and the ants are known for its attraction to honey, and attends to  lycaenid caterpillars and other Hemiptera that produces honey.

Etymology
The name is said to be derived from Greek omalus, 'flat' and Latin notus, 'back', in reference to the appearance of a worker's propodeum. The proper ancient Greek word for "flat" is however homalos (ὁμαλός) or homalēs (ὁμαλής).

References

Iridomyrmex
Hymenoptera of Australia
Insects described in 2011